The JMC Teshun is a light commercial van manufactured by Jiangling Motors based on the fourth generation Ford Transit.

Overview 
Originally being a licensed Ford Transit production, the Jiangling-Ford model was sold from 2006-2017 and styling remained unchanged throughout the model years sold as a Ford product.

Starting from May 2017, a version of the old Transit manufactured by JMC was rebadged and slightly redesigned with a completely new front DRG and restyled tail lamp inserts. The rebadged version was then called the JMC Teshun. Pricing ranges from 99,800 yuan to 139,200 yuan.

Specifications 
The Teshun is powered by a range of engine options: a 2.8 liter turbo diesel engine producing 108 hp and a 4G69S4N 2.4 liter inline-4 gasoline engine producing 136 hp. Both engines are mated to a 5-speed manual gearbox. The JMC Teshun is available in 3-seater, 6- to 8-seater, 10-seater, and 14- to 15-seater models matching with a selection of low, middle, and tall roof options.

2020 facelift
A facelift  of the Teshun was launched in 2020, featuring a slightly redesigned front bumper. The updated model range also features an additional 9-seater layout and engines that meet both National V and National VI emissions standards, with the engine being a 2.8 liter turbo diesel engine producing 116 hp and 285N·m mated to a 5-speed manual gearbox.

2021 facelift
Another facelift was launched in 2021, featuring a redesigned front fascia. The updated model range also features the same 2.8 liter turbo diesel engine producing 116 hp and 285N·m mated to a 5-speed manual gearbox. An additional Taurus Edition is also available featuring gold accents on the exterior and interior.

Sales
In 2017, around 11,884 vans were sold. In January 2018, 2,923 vans were sold by JMC. Around 10,703 vans were sold in the fourth quarter of 2019.

JMC Jingma Fuyun EV 
The JMC Jingma Fuyun EV (江铃晶马福运EV) is a rebadged electric van based on the pre-facelift JMC Teshun sold under the Jiangling Jingma (JMC Jingma) brand from February 2023. The Fuyun EV electric van is powered by a 120kW electric motor with a maximum output of 320N·m with a 85.89kWh battery supplied by CATL supporting a range of 345 km (214 miles).

References

External links 

Official JMC Teshun website

Minibuses
Rear-wheel-drive vehicles
Cars of China
School bus chassis
Vans
Vehicles introduced in 2017